Ekinlik is a village in the Başmakçı District, Afyonkarahisar Province, Turkey. Its population is 142 (2021). It is located east of Akkoyunlu.

References

Villages in Başmakçı District